Siddharth Kara is an American author, activist, and expert on modern-day slavery and human trafficking, child labor, and related human rights issues. He is a British Academy Global Professor, an Adjunct Lecturer in Public Policy at the Kennedy School of Government at Harvard University and the University of California, Berkeley, and an associate professor at the University of Nottingham. He is best known for his book trilogy on modern slavery: Sex Trafficking: Inside the Business of Modern Slavery (2009), Bonded Labor: Tackling the System of Slavery in South Asia (2012), and Modern Slavery: A Modern Perspective (2017).

Early life 
Kara was born in Knoxville, Tennessee, to Indian parents of Hindu and Parsi background. He grew up between Memphis, Tennessee, where he attended Memphis University School, and Mumbai, India, where he spent most of his summers.

Education and early career 
Kara received a BA in English and Philosophy from Duke University (including one semester at Queen Mary College, University of London). While at Duke University, Kara co-founded the "Duke Refugee Action Project", which was the precursor to the prestigious Hart Leadership Program at the Sanford School of Public Policy The project was set up to enable students to volunteer in Bosnian refugee camps in the former Yugoslavia. He and a few other students obtained a grant from the University, learned basic Bosnian, and procured placements from the United Nations High Commissioner for Refugees to volunteer at camps in the region. That summer, he lived as the refugees, in wretched conditions with barely enough to eat.  During this time, he heard countless tales of brutish atrocities, including tales of Serbian soldiers who would raid Bosnian villages, execute the men, then round up the women and young girls, rape them and traffic them to brothels across Europe.

Kara worked as an investment banker at Merrill Lynch in New York City for several years, during which time he was involved in some of the firm's largest M&A and equity financing transactions. Subsequently, he co-founded a media technology company and set up his own finance and M&A firm in Los Angeles, working and consulting for several corporations and non-profit organizations.

He received an MBA from Columbia University. While attending Columbia, he became increasingly aware of the need for a more analytical finance and economics approach to understanding eradicating this highly profitable global business. The summer he graduated from Columbia, he embarked on the first of several long self-funded journeys across the world to research human trafficking and other forms of contemporary slavery. Upon his return, he decided not to resume his career in investment banking, in order to be able to continue his research and analysis of contemporary slavery. He moved to Los Angeles, where he worked and consulted by day, while continuing to make research trips around the world. During this time, he wrote a screenplay as well as his first non-fiction book based on his research.

He then received a law degree from the BPP Law School in London.

Research and writing
Kara's research travels have taken him to thirty countries across six continents, where he has witnessed firsthand the sale of human beings into slavery, interviewed over one thousand former and current slaves of all kinds, and confronted some of the individuals who trafficked and exploited them.  Most of the research for Kara's books has been self-funded, though he has also received research support from major charitable foundations such as Humanity United and Google.org.

Kara has published three non-fiction books that provide his approach to all forms of contemporary slavery.

Kara has also published several articles in legal and academic journals such as the Northwestern Journal of International Human Rights, Harvard International Review, Solutions Journal, and World Politics Review.

Kara has also edited two thematic issues of the journal Social Inclusion (in 2015 and 2017), titled 'Perspectives on Human Trafficking and Modern Forms of Slavery'.

Sex Trafficking: Inside the Business of Modern Slavery (2009) 

Kara's first non-fiction book on contemporary slavery, Sex Trafficking: Inside the Business of Modern Slavery, was published by Columbia University Press in January 2009. In May 2010, a second edition was published in paperback. The book won the 2010 Frederick Douglass Book Prize, given to the most outstanding nonfiction book on the subject of slavery and/or abolition and antislavery movements. Since the inception of the Award in 1999, numerous books on the subject of modern-day slavery have been submitted, but Kara's book was the first to be awarded the prize.

The book has been recommended by the Under-Secretary-General of the United Nations and head of the United Nations Office on Drugs and Crime. It has been lauded by academics, policy-makers and the press, with the Financial Times describing it as an "eloquent and campaigning book", and slavery experts heralding it as "groundbreaking" and the "best book yet on the enduring problem of modern-day slavery".

In the book, Kara draws on his background in finance, economics and law to provide what is widely considered to be the first ever comprehensive business, economic and legal analysis of contemporary slavery worldwide, focusing on sex trafficking, its most profitable and barbaric form. He describes the local factors and global economic forces that gave rise to this and other forms of modern day slavery across the last two decades and quantifies, for the first time, the size, growth, and profitability of each slave industry. Finally, he recommends the legal, tactical, and policy measures that would target vulnerable sectors in these slave industries, and help to abolish slavery.

Bonded Labor: Tackling the System of Slavery in South Asia (2012) 

Kara's second non-fiction book on contemporary slavery, Bonded Labor: Tackling the System of Slavery in South Asia, was released by Columbia University Press in October 2012. The book focuses on the pervasive system of bonded labor: while sex trafficking is the most profitable form of modern-day slavery, bonded labor is the most prevalent form, encompassing roughly six out of every ten slaves in the world. Its geographic focus is South Asia, covering such industries as hand-woven-carpet making, tea and rice farming, construction, brick manufacture, and frozen-shrimp production. He also follows supply chains directly to Western consumers. Kara's concludes with ten specific initiatives to eliminate the system of bonded labor from South Asia.

The book received high commendations from scholars, activists, non-profit organisations and governments, and was covered as part of a three part series on the CNN International primetime news program Connect the World with Becky Anderson. It was lauded as "a necessary book for all those concerned with the struggle against contemporary forced labour and slavery" by the International Labour Organization of the United Nations, "perhaps the most ambitious and reasoned treatment of this form of slavery in the modern era" by Humanity United, "a must-read for all those who work against modern day slavery" by award-winning activist Ruchira Gupta, and a book "instinct with a passion for a world free from exploitation and for all to enjoy dignity and fulfilment" by noted social activist and leader Swami Agnivesh.

Tainted Carpets: Slavery and Child Labor in India's Hand-Made Carpet Sector (2014)

Kara was the lead investigator and author of the report Tainted Carpets: Slavery and Child Labor in India's Hand-Made Carpet Sector, which was released through the Harvard School of Public Health in January 2014. This report is the largest single first-hand study of slavery and child labor conducted to date, and also the largest single study of slavery and child labor in the supply chain of any commodity.  Spanning hundreds of productions sites across nine states in northern India, the study found estimated prevalence rates of 45% for forced labor, 28% for bonded labor, and 20% for child labor. Production sites of over 172 exporters of carpets from India were found to be tainted by slavery. These same exporters are directly linked to the sale of carpets at some of the largest retailers in the United States. The report makes recommendations on how to improve the conditions that were found.

Modern Slavery: A Global Perspective (2017) 

Kara's third non-fiction book on contemporary slavery, Modern Slavery: A Global Perspective was released by Columbia University Press in October 2017. The book had its launch at the United Nations, and has been lauded by experts in the field, including Luis CdeBaca, former U.S. Ambassador-at-Large to Monitor and Combat Trafficking in Persons and Swanee Hunt, former U.S. Ambassador to Austria.

Media

Kara has been a featured contributor on several other primetime programs, including CNN's Piers Morgan Tonight and CNBC's Crime Inc. He also appeared in 2010 as a panelist on the BBC News primetime current affairs program BBC World Debate, held in Luxor, Egypt.

Kara is a regular contributor to The CNN Freedom Project: Ending Modern Day Slavery, CNN's major year-long initiative, launched in 2011, to expose modern-day slavery around the world and highlight the efforts being made to eradicate it. His unique journey across South Asia to research for his second book on bonded labor was covered as a ten-week series in 2010 on the CNN International primetime news program Connect the World with Becky Anderson. The launch of his book was subsequently covered in a three part series on the same news program.

Academia
Kara currently teaches a course on Human Trafficking and Modern Slavery at both Harvard University and University of California, Berkeley.

Harvard University
In the fall of 2009, Kara became the first Fellow on Human Trafficking with the Carr Center for Human Rights Policy at the Kennedy School of Government at Harvard University. In the Spring of 2012, Kara taught the first course on human trafficking at the Harvard Kennedy School.  He also accepted a joint appointment as a visiting scientist on Forced Labor at the FXB Center for Health and Human Rights at Harvard School of Public Health. In the spring of 2013, Kara became an adjunct lecturer in public policy to continue to teach his course on slavery and trafficking.  He also accepted an appointment as the director of the Program on Human Trafficking and Modern Slavery at the Carr Center for Human Rights Policy at the Harvard Kennedy School. Kara also sits on the editorial board of the Cambridge University Press book series Slavery Since Emancipation, which is sponsored by Historians Against Slavery.

University of California, Berkeley
In the Spring of 2016, Kara became a lecturer in Global Poverty and Practice at the Blum Center for Developing Economies at the University of California, Berkeley, teaching the same course on slavery and trafficking that he teaches later in the year at Harvard University.

British Academy and University of Nottingham, UK
In the Summer of 2020, Kara was one of 10 experts and scholars awarded the prestigious Global Professorship by the British Academy. As part of the program he began a fellowship with the Rights Lab and the School of Sociology and Social Policy at the University of Nottingham in October 2020.

Consulting
Kara speaks and consults extensively on contemporary slavery and human rights around the world. He advises the United Nations, US government and several other governments on antislavery policy and law. He also advises several international and non-governmental organizations, including the Clinton Global Initiative and Humanity United. He has spoken at numerous conferences and institutions and has been interviewed on over fifty radio and television shows in the US, Europe, South Asia and East Asia.

Kara serves on the board of several antislavery organizations, and also serves on the committee founded by Kirk Douglas that is lobbying the US Congress to provide an official apology for pre-bellum slavery. He has testified several times in international forums as an expert on human trafficking, including in 2005, before the Congressional Human Rights Caucus of the United States Congress. In 2009, he was selected as a Fellow for the TEDIndia conference.

In September 2011, Kara was sent by the U.S. Department of State to discuss anti-trafficking initiatives with the governments of Singapore and Malaysia. The Singapore government subsequently invited Kara to be the guest speaker at the launch of the country's first National Plan of Action on human trafficking in March 2012.

Personal
Kara spends his time between his homes in Los Angeles and Boston.  He is married to neuroscientist Aditi Shankardass, daughter of celebrity lawyer Vijay Shankardass and granddaughter of Ambassador Shanti Swaroop Dhavan.

References

External links
 Interview with Siddharth Kara, "How to End Sex Trafficking and Modern Day Slavery" in Forbes
 Interview with Siddharth Kara, Business Daily on BBC Radio
 Talk by Siddharth Kara, Columbia University, New York (Video)
 Lecture by Siddharth Kara, Harvard University, Cambridge (Video)
 Sex Trafficking: Inside the Business of Modern Slavery

American people of Parsi descent
Columbia Business School alumni
Duke University Trinity College of Arts and Sciences alumni
Harvard Fellows
Harvard Kennedy School people
21st-century American non-fiction writers
American economics writers
American male writers of Indian descent
Living people
Debt bondage in South Asia
Anti–human trafficking activists
American male non-fiction writers
Year of birth missing (living people)
21st-century American male writers